Dhannipur is a village in Faizabad district (officially Ayodhya district) of Uttar Pradesh, India. In February 2020, the government allotted  of agricultural land at Dhannipur in Ayodhya municipal corporation to the Uttar Pradesh Sunni Central Waqf Board as an alternative site for constructing a mosque, to replace the Babri Masjid that was demolished in 1992. The Babri Masjid, after being re-built is now known as the Ayodhya Mosque.

See also 

 Ayodhya Mosque, Dhannipur

References 

Villages in Faizabad district